The 2006–07 San Miguel Beermen season was the 32nd season of the franchise in the Philippine Basketball Association (PBA).

Key dates
August 20: The 2006 PBA Draft took place in Fort Bonifacio, Taguig.

Draft picks

Roster

Philippine Cup

Game log

|- bgcolor="#edbebf"
| 1
| October 6
| Red Bull
| 
| 
| 
| 
| Araneta Coliseum
| 0–1
|- bgcolor="#edbebf"
| 2
| October 11
| Sta.Lucia
| 95–98
| Calaguio (22)
| 
| 
| Araneta Coliseum
| 0–2
|- bgcolor="#edbebf" 
| 3
| October 15
| Welcoat
| 88–96
| Calaguio (17)
| 
| 
| Araneta Coliseum
| 0–3
|- bgcolor="#bbffbb" 
| 4
| October 20
| Alaska
| 81–71
| Seigle (25)
| 
| 
| Ynares Center
| 1–3
|- bgcolor="#bbffbb" 
| 5
| October 22
| Brgy.Ginebra
| 101–97
| Seigle (28)
| 
| 
| Cuneta Astrodome
| 2–3
|- bgcolor="#bbffbb" 
| 6
| October 28
| Air21
| 118–102
| Gonzales (18)
| 
| 
| Subic, Zambales
| 3–3

|- bgcolor="#bbffbb" 
| 7
| November 3
| Purefoods
| 87–79
| Seigle (24)
| 
| 
| Araneta Coliseum
| 4–3
|- bgcolor="#bbffbb" 
| 8
| November 8
| Coca Cola
| 119–103
| Seigle (28)
| 
| 
| Araneta Coliseum
| 5–3
|- bgcolor="#edbebf" 
| 9
| November 10
| Brgy.Ginebra
| 87–92
| 
| 
| 
| Araneta Coliseum
| 5–4
|- bgcolor="#bbffbb" 
| 10
| November 15
| Red Bull
| 84–78
| 
| 
| 
| Araneta Coliseum
| 6–4
|- bgcolor="#edbebf"
| 11
| November 19
| Talk 'N Text
| 84–90
| Hontiveros (14)
| 
| 
| Araneta Coliseum
| 6–5
|- bgcolor="#bbffbb" 
| 12
| November 25
| Purefoods
| 100–81
| Seigle (24)
| 
| 
| Olivarez Gym
| 7–5
|- bgcolor="#bbffbb" 
| 13
| November 29
| Sta.Lucia
| 113–98
| Seigle (33)
| 
| 
| Araneta Coliseum
| 8–5

|- bgcolor="#bbffbb" 
| 14
| December 2
| Alaska
| 103–99
| Tugade (20)
| 
| 
| General Santos
| 9–5
|- bgcolor="#bbffbb"
| 15
| December 9
| Coca Cola
| 108–91
| Seigle (19)
| 
| 
| Lucena City
| 10–5
|- bgcolor="#bbffbb"
| 16
| December 13
| Welcoat
| 97–85
| Seigle (28)
| 
| 
| Araneta Coliseum
| 11–5
|- bgcolor="#bbffbb" 
| 17
| December 17
| Talk 'N Text
| 114–102
| Seigle (26)
| 
| 
| Araneta Coliseum
| 12–5
|- bgcolor="#bbffbb" 
| 18
| December 25
| Air21
| 108–104
| Tugade (19)
| 
| 
| Araneta Coliseum
| 13–5

Fiesta Conference

Game log

|- bgcolor="#edbebf" 
| 1
| March 9
| Red Bull
| 84–102
|  Peña (17)
| 
| 
| Cuneta Astrodome
| 0–1
|- bgcolor="#edbebf" 
| 2
| March 14
| Air21
| 78–88
| Cablay (17)
| 
| 
| Araneta Coliseum
| 0–2
|- bgcolor="#edbebf" 
| 3
| March 17
| Coca Cola
| 64–82
| Millan (11) Calaguio (11)
| 
| 
| Lanao del Norte
| 0–3
|- bgcolor="#edbebf"
| 4
| March 21
| Purefoods
| 77–79
| McMillan (27)
| 
| 
| Araneta Coliseum
| 0–4
|- bgcolor="#edbebf"
| 5
| March 25
| Brgy.Ginebra
| 84–102
| McMillan (41)
| 
| 
| Araneta Coliseum
| 0–5
|- bgcolor="#edbebf" 
| 6
| March 29
| Sta.Lucia
| 90–95
| McMillan (31)
| 
| 
| Muntinlupa
| 0–6

|- bgcolor="#bbffbb" 
| 7
| April 4
| Talk 'N Text
| 108–103
| McMillan (41)
| 
| 
| Araneta Coliseum
| 1–6
|- bgcolor="#edbebf" 
| 8
| April 11
| Alaska
| 84–94
| Tenorio (13)
| 
| 
| Araneta Coliseum
| 1–7
|- bgcolor="#bbffbb" 
| 9
| April 15
| Welcoat
| 96–90
| Young (19)
| 
| 
| Araneta Coliseum
| 2–7
|- bgcolor="#bbffbb" 
| 10
| April 21
| Sta.Lucia
| 78–61
| 
| 
| 
| Tacloban, Leyte
| 3–7
|- bgcolor="#bbffbb" 
| 11
| April 24
| Alaska
| 100–96
| 
| 
| 
| Cuneta Astrodome
| 4–7

|- bgcolor="#bbffbb" 
| 12
| May 6
| Purefoods
| 78–75
| Young (14) Racela (14)
| 
| 
| Araneta Coliseum
| 5–7
|- bgcolor="#bbffbb" 
| 13
| May 12
| Red Bull
| 98–93
| Ildefonso (20)
| 
| 
| Cebu City
| 6–7
|- bgcolor="#bbffbb" 
| 14
| May 17
| Coca Cola
| 84–71
| Wilson (16) Peña (16)
| 
| 
| The Arena in San Juan
| 7–7
|- bgcolor="#bbffbb" 
| 15
| May 23
| Welcoat
| 119–79
| Ildefonso (20)
| 
| 
| Ynares Center
| 8–7
|- bgcolor="#bbffbb" 
| 16
| May 27
| Brgy.Ginebra
| 101–98
| Peña (22)
| 
| 
| Araneta Coliseum
| 9–7
|- bgcolor="#edbebf" 
| 17
| May 30
| Air21
| 107–109
| Ildefonso (30)
| 
| 
| Araneta Coliseum
| 9–8

|- bgcolor="#bbffbb" 
| 18
| June 3
| Talk 'N Text
| 105–99
| Young (26) 
| Young (15)
| 
| Araneta Coliseum
| 10–8

Transactions

Trades

Subtractions

References

San Miguel Beermen seasons
San